Ailton César Duarte Silva (born 5 January 1996) is a Cape Verdean footballer who plays for S.C. Braga B, as a forward.

Football career
On 21 January 2015, Ailton made his professional debut with Gil Vicente in a 2014–15 Taça da Liga match against Marítimo.

References

External links

Stats and profile at LPFP 

1996 births
Living people
People from Mindelo
Cape Verdean footballers
Association football forwards
Liga Portugal 2 players
Segunda Divisão players
Gil Vicente F.C. players
S.C. Braga B players
C.D. Trofense players